The  is a Shinto shrine located at the historic Shikemichi in Nishi-ku, Nagoya, central Japan. The shrine is dedicated to the goddess Ko-no-hana-no-saku-ya hime.

History 

According to the historic "Owari-shi", it was transferred to this site in 1647. The site has seven old camphor and zelkova trees, some of which date back to 300 years. It is designated by the city as an asset for preservation. 

A stone torii gate is the entrance, a small stone path lined with protective animal statues leads to the main shrine. 

The annual shrine festival takes place on October 1–2.

See also 
 Fuji Sengen Shrine (Naka-ku, Nagoya)

External links

Shinto shrines in Nagoya